Orbost Airport  is located  northeast of Marlo, near Orbost, Victoria, Australia.

See also
 List of airports in Victoria

References

Airports in Victoria (Australia)
East Gippsland